The 2012–13 Portland Pilots women's basketball team is representing the University of Portland in the 2012–13 college basketball season. This is head coach Jim Sollar's twenty-sixth season at Portland. The Pilots are members of the West Coast Conference and will play their home games at Chiles Center.

Before the season
The Pilots were picked to finish eighth in the WCC.

Roster

Schedule and results

|-
!colspan=9 style="background:#FFFFFF; color:#461D7C;"| Exhibition

|-
!colspan=9 style="background:#461D7C; color:#FFFFFF;"| Regular Season

|-
!colspan=9 style="background:#FFFFFF; color:#461D7C;"| 2013 West Coast Conference women's basketball tournament

Rankings

See also
Portland Pilots women's basketball

References

Portland
Portland Pilots women's basketball seasons